The 1965 Wichita Shockers football team was an American football team that represented Wichita State University as a member of the Missouri Valley Conference during the 1965 NCAA University Division football season. In its first season under head coach George Karras, the team compiled a 2–7 record (0–4 against conference opponents), finished last out of five teams in the MVC, and was outscored by a total of 170 to 120. The team played its home games at Veterans Field, now known as Cessna Stadium.

Schedule

References

Wichita State
Wichita State Shockers football seasons
Wichita State Shockers football